Kaj Sylvan (22 April 1923 – 17 January 2020) was a Danish sprint canoeist who competed in the late 1950s. At the 1956 Summer Olympics in Melbourne, he was disqualified in the finals of the C-2 1000 m event.

References
Kaj Sylvan's profile at Sports Reference.com
Kaj Sylvan's obituary 

1923 births
2020 deaths
Canoeists at the 1956 Summer Olympics
Danish male canoeists
Olympic canoeists of Denmark